Engineers is a limited edition (3000 copies) digipak live album, released by Gary Numan's previous label, Beggars Banquet. The album was recorded at the Capitol Theatre, Sydney, Australia on 31 May 1980.

Track listing
"Introduction : Theme From Replicas"
"Airlane"
"Me! I Disconnect From You"
"Praying to the Aliens"
"M.E."
"Films"
"We Are So Fragile"
"Are 'Friends' Electric?"
"Conversation"
"Remind Me To Smile"
"Replicas"
"Remember I Was Vapour"
"Trois Gymnopédies" (Erik Satie)
"Cars"
"I Die: You Die"
"Bombers"
"Tracks"
All songs written by Gary Numan except where noted.

Personnel
Gary Numan - vocals, guitar, synthesizers
Paul Gardiner - bass guitar
Chris Payne - keyboards, viola (left tower)
Cedric Sharpley - drums
Rrussell Bell - guitar, keyboards, electronic percussion
Denis Haines - keyboards (right tower)

References

External links
Numanme.co.uk

2008 live albums
Gary Numan live albums